The Stato da Màr or Domini da Mar was the name given to the Republic of Venice's maritime and overseas possessions from around 1000 to 1797, including at various times parts of what are now Istria, Dalmatia, Montenegro, Albania, Greece and notably the Ionian Islands, Peloponnese, Crete, Cyclades, Euboea, as well as Cyprus. 

It was one of the three subdivisions of the Republic of Venice's possessions, the other two being the Dogado, i.e. Venice proper, and the Domini di Terraferma in northern Italy. 

The overseas possessions, particularly islands such as Corfu, Crete and Cyprus, played a critical role in Venice's commercial and military leadership. In his landmark study on the Mediterranean world in the 16th century, historian Fernand Braudel described these islands as "Venice's motionless fleet".

History 

The creation of Venice's overseas empire began around the year 1000 with the defeat of the Narentines by Doge Pietro II Orseolo and recognition of Venetian rule by Dalmatian city-states, allowing the Doge to call itself "Duke of Dalmatia" for the next few decades. Control over the latter, however, would not be stabilized until the early 15th century. 

In the 12th and 13th centuries, Venice gradually established its rule over Istria, which lasted until the end of the Republic. 

Venice's overseas domains reached its greatest nominal extent at the conclusion of the Fourth Crusade in 1204, with declaration of the acquisition of three octaves of the Byzantine Empire. However, most of this territory was never controlled by Venice, being held by the Greek Byzantine successor states, namely the Despotate of Epirus and especially the Empire of Nicaea. Venice remained an important player in Constantinople, holding the key position of Podestà until its Byzantine reconquest in 1261, and more broadly in the region during the politically complex period known as the Frankokratia. Of its Fourth Crusade acquisitions, it kept Euboea until the 15th century, the Cyclades until the 16th, and Crete until the 17th. 
 
The aftermath of the War of Chioggia in the late 14th century saw another period of rapid growth of the Venetian empire. Corfu came under permanent Venetian rule in 1386, Argos and Nauplia in 1388–1394, the Adriatic ports of Durazzo and Alessio on the Albanian coast in 1392, followed by Scutari in 1396 and Drivasto in 1397. In 1402, the Battle of Ankara temporarily reversed the rise of the Ottoman Empire in the east, and the death of Duke of Milan Giangaleazzo Visconti created a power vacuum in northern Italy that enabled expansion of the Domini di Terraferma. The changed climate created by the Ottoman Interregnum and the ensuing Treaty of Gallipoli in 1403 led to a growth of commerce and the acquisition of a new string of fortresses in Greece: Lepanto in 1407, Patras in 1408, Navarino in 1410, and temporarily Thessalonica in 1423. In Dalmatia, where Venice had been forced to cede its possessions to the Kingdom of Hungary by the Treaty of Zadar (1358), it took advantage of the conflict between Ladislaus of Naples and Sigismund over the Hungarian Crown, and in 1409 secured the cession by Ladislaus of several of his Dalmatian domains —Cres, Rab, Pag, Zadar, Vrana and Novigrad— for 100,000 ducats.

In 1489, Venice also acquired Cyprus, which it kept until Ottoman conquest in 1570–1571. 

The Venetian hold over navigation in the Adriatic sea was maintained for centuries, to the extent that it was labeled "Mare di Venezia" (sea of Venice) on maps of the seventeenth and eighteenth centuries.

From the 15th century onwards, the history of Venice's overseas empire is dominated by successive Ottoman–Venetian wars. Venice lost many territories but also occasionally gained some, most notably the Peloponnese from the late 1680s to 1715 and the Dalmatian Hinterland also in the 1680s. After that date, the remaining overseas domains, kept until the Fall of the Republic of Venice to Napoleon I in 1797, were all in Istria, Dalmatia, and the Ionian Islands, with none left east of Kythira and Antikythera.

Domains 
The locations are listed broadly from closest to farthest from Venice. Where there is a difference between the name in Venetian language and standard Italian, the Venetian version is indicated first. Feudal lordships held by Venetians, such as Andrea Ghisi in Tinos and Mykonos, are included.

In today's northeastern Italy, Slovenia and Croatia

 Venetian Istria: 
 Trieste, 1283–1287, 1368–1372 and 1508–1509
 Muja/Muggia, 1420–1797
 Koper (Capodistria), 1145–1797
 Izola (Isola), 1145–1797
 Piran (Piràn/Pirano), 1283–1797
 Umag (Umago), 1269–1797
 Motovun (Montona d'Istria), 1278–1797
 Novigrad (Cittanova d'Istria), 1270–1797
 Poreč (Parenzo), 1267–1797
 Rovinj (Rovigno), 1283–1797
 Sveti Lovreč (San Lorenso del Paxenadego/San Lorenzo del Pasenatico), 1271–1797
 Bale (Vale/Valle d'Istria), 1331–1797
 Vodnjan (Dignano), 1330–1797
 Pula (Pola), 1145–1291 and 1331–1797
 Labin (Albona) and Plomin (Fianona), 1420–1797
 Plomin (Fianona), ?–1797
 Pazin (Pisino), 1508–1509
 Kvarner Gulf (Quarnaro): 
 Rijeka (Fiume), 1508–1509
 Cres Island (Cherso) and Lošinj Islands (Lusin/Lussino), 15C–1797 except brief Ottoman occupation of Cres during the Cretan War (1645–1669)
 Krk Island (Vegia/Veglia), 1480–1797 except brief Ottoman occupation during the Cretan War (1645–1669)
 Rab Island (Arbe), 1409–1797
 Pag Island (Pago), 1420–1797 except brief Ottoman occupation during the Cretan War (1645–1669)
 Novigrad (Novegradi), 1409–1797 except Ottoman occupation in 1646–1647
 Nin (Nona), 1328–1358 and 1409–1797
 Zadar (Zara), 998–1186, 1202–1358 and 1409–1797
 Biograd (Zaravecia/Zaravecchia after 1204), early 11C, 1115–1124, 1125, 1409–1797
 Vrana (Aurana or Laurana Arauzona), 1409–1538, 1647 and 1683–1797
 Ugljan Island (Ugliano) and Dugi Island (Isola Lunga or Isola Grossa), 13C–1358 and 1409–1797
 Šibenik (Sebenego/Sebenico), 1116–1133, 1322–1358 and 1412–1797
 Trogir (Traù), 1125–1133 and 1420–1797
 Split (Spàlato), 998–1019, 1116–1117, 1118–1124, 1127–1141 and 1420–1797
 Fortress of Klis (Clissa), 1648–1797
 Omiš (Almissa), 1444–1797
 Vis Island (Lissa), ca. 1409–1797
 Brač Island (Braza/Brazza), 1268–1358 and 1420–1797
 Makarska (Macarsca), 13C–1326 and 1646–1797
 Hvar Island (Łexina/Lesina), 1331–1358 and 1409–1797
 Korčula Island (Curzola), 1255–1358 and 1409–1797
 Dalmatian Hinterland, mostly conquered during the Morean War: 
 Obrovac (Obrovazzo), Benkovac (Bencovazzo), Skradin (Scardona), Vrlika (Verlicca) and Sinj (Signo), 1686–1797
 Knin (Tenin), 1647 and 1688–1797
 Imotski (Imoschi), 1717–1797
 Vrgorac (Vergoraz/Vergorazzo), 1690–1797
 Metković (Porto Narenta), 1685–1797
 Dubrovnik (Raguxa/Ragusa), 1000–1030 and 1205–1358

In today's Montenegro and Albania

 Herceg Novi (Castelnuovo), 1687–1797 
 Risan (Risano), 1688–1797
 Kotor (Càtaro/Cattaro) and Perast (Perasto), 1420–1797 
 Sveti Stefan (Santo Stefano), 1423–1797
 Budva (Budua) and Sutomore (Spizza), 1420–1797
 Bar (Antivari), 1443–1571
 Ulcinj (Dulcigno), 1405–1571
 Shkodër (Scutari), 1396–1479 
 Drisht (Drivasto), 1393–1423 and 1442–1478
 Lezhë (Alessio), 1386–1478 and 1501–1506
 Durrës (Durazo/Durazzo), 1205–1213 and 1392–1501 
 Vlorë (Valona) and Kaninë Castle (Canina), 1690–1691
 Butrint (Butrinto), 1350 and 1386–1797

In today's Southern Italy (Venetian Apulian ports)

 Trani, 1496–1509
 Mola di Bari and Polignano a Mare, 1495–1509 and 1528–1530
 Monopoli, 1484–1509 and 1528–1530
 Brindisi and Otranto, 1496–1509
 Gallipoli, 1484

In modern Greece, Cyprus or Turkish Aegean islands

 Kerkyra (Corfù) and Paxi Island (Passo), 1207–1214 and 1386–1797 
 Parga (Parga), 1401–1797 with several brief Ottoman occupations
 Preveza (Prevesa), 1401–1463, 1684–1699, 1717–1797
 Arta (Arta), 1717–1797
 Vonitsa (Vonizza), 1684–1797
 Lefkada Island (Santa Maura), 1684–1797 
 Cephalonia (Cefalonia), 1500–1797 
 Ithaca (Itaca), 1503–1797
 Zakynthos (Zante), 1479–1797
 Nafpaktos (Lepanto), 1390 and 1407–1499
 Amfissa (Salona), 1687–1697
 Peloponnese (Morea): various outposts until Ottoman conquest in the 15th-16th centuries, then region–wide Venetian rule 1688–1715 as Realm of the Morea 
 Patras (Patraso/Patrasso), 1408–1430 and 1687–1715
 Pylos (Navarino), 1417–1501 and 1686–1715
 Methoni (Modon/Modone), 1207–1500 and 1686–1715
 Koroni (Coron/Corone), 1207–1500 and 1685–1715
 Mani Peninsula (Braccio della Maina), 1487–1499
 Monemvasia (Malvasia), 1464–1540 and 1690–1715
 Argos (Argo), 1394–1462 and 1687–1715
 Nafplio (Napoli di Romània), 1388–1540 and 1686–1715
 Kythira (Cerigo) and Antikythera Island (Cerigotto), 1238–1715 and 1718–1797
 Crete, known to Venice as the Realm of Candia: 
 Chania (La Canea), ca. 1210–1263 and 1285–1645
 Rethymno (Retimo), ca. 1210–1646
 Sitia (Sitia), ca. 1210–1651
 Heraklion (Candia), ca. 1210–1669 
 Gramvousa (Grabusa), ca. 1210–1691
 Souda Islet (Suda) and Spinalonga Island (Spinalonga), ca. 1210–1715
 In the Dodecanese: 
 Karpathos (Scarpanto) and Kasos (Caso), 1306–1538
 Halki (Calchi), 1204–?
 Tilos (Piscopi)
 Kalymnos (Calimno), 1207–1310
 Leros (Lero), 13th century–1309
 Patmos (Patmo), 1659–1669
 Astypalaia (Stampalia), 1207–1522 and 1648–1668
 the Cyclades, most of which Venice held as the Duchy of the Archipelago: 
 Syros (Siro), 1207–1522
 Paros (Paro), Antiparos (Antiparo) and Mykonos (Micono), 1207–1537
 Naxos (Nasso), Milos (Milo), Folegandros (Policandro), Andros (Andro), Ios (Io), Amorgos (Amorgo), Kimolos (Argentiera), Sikinos (Sicandro), 1207–1566
 Santorini (Santorini), 1207–ca. 1280 and 1301–1576
 Kythnos (Citno) and Sifnos (Sifanto), 1207–1617
 Tinos (Tino), 1207–1715
 Saronic Islands: 
 Spetses (Velvina or Spezia), 1220–1460
 Hydra (Idra), 1204–1566
 Poros, together with (on the mainland) Methana, Troezen (Damala) and Epidaurus (Epidauro), 1484–1715
 Aegina (Egina), 1451–1537
 Athens (Atene), 1394–1403 and 1687–1688 
 Euboea (Negroponte), 1211–1470 
 Pteleos, 1322–1470
 the Sporades including Skiathos (Sciato), Skopelos (Scopelo), Alonnisos (Alonneso) and Skyros (Sciro), 1207–1270s and 1453–1538
 Lemnos (Lemno), 1464–1479 and 1656–1657
 Samothrace (Samotracia), 1204–1355
 Thessaloniki (Salonico/Salonicco), 1423–1430 
 Gelibolu Peninsula (Gallipoli) and Tekirdağ (Rodosto), 1204–1235
 Beyoğlu (Pera) neighborhood in Constantinople, 1204–1261 
 Gökçeada (Imbro), 1377–1462
 Bozcaada (Tenedo), 1377–1381, ?–1455 and 1656–1657 
 Cyprus (Sipro/Cipro), 1489–1570
 Famagusta (Famagosta), 1489–1571

In today's Russia
 Tanais (Tana), 13C–1332

See also 
 Venetian navy
 Savi agli Ordini
 Provveditore Generale da Mar
 Captain General of the Sea
 Venetian Works of Defence between the 16th and 17th centuries: Stato da Terra – western Stato da Mar
 Genoese colonies

Notes

Bibliography 

 
 
 
 
 

 
Overseas empires
Venetian period in the history of Greece
992 establishments
10th-century establishments in the Republic of Venice
1797 disestablishments in the Republic of Venice
History of Venice